Kowŏn County is a county in South Hamgyŏng province, North Korea. It lies at the southern tip of the province.

Physical features
The highest point is Palbongsan.  The western reaches of the county are high and mountainous, while the east is a low-lying plain. Major rivers and streams include the Chŏnt'an River (전탄강), Tŏkchi River (덕지강), Sabakch'ŏn (사박천), and the Kuryongch'ŏn (구룡천).  54% of the county's area is forested. The climate is generally continental, but is moderated by foehn winds blowing from the mountains. This makes it one of the warmer parts of the province.

Administrative divisions
Kowŏn county is divided into 1 ŭp (town), 1 rodongjagu (workers' district) and 18 ri (villages):

Economy

Agriculture
Agriculture is the predominant local industry. Orcharding and livestock raising are also carried out, as is sericulture (silk farming).

Mining and manufacturing
There are deposits of limestone in the county, and mining and construction-materials manufacturing also contribute to the local economy.

Transport
Kowŏn is connected to the rest of North Korea by rail and road. The P'yŏngra and Kangwŏn lines of the Korean State Railway run through the county.

See also
Geography of North Korea
Administrative divisions of North Korea

External links

Counties of South Hamgyong